Unión Club Cartes is a Spanish football team located in Cartes, in the autonomous community of Cantabria. Founded in 1921 it currently plays in Tercera División RFEF – Group 3, holding home matches at Campo de Fútbol El Ansar with a capacity of 1,000 spectators.

History
UC Cartes was founded in 1921.

Club background
Unión Club Cartes – (1921–1956)
Soldevilla Unión Club Cartes – (1956–1970)
Unión Club Cartes – (1970–present)

Season to season

2 seasons in Tercera División
1 season in Tercera División RFEF

References 

Football clubs in Cantabria
Association football clubs established in 1921
1921 establishments in Spain
Sports leagues established in 1921